This article contains a list of the most studied restriction enzymes whose names start with E to F inclusive.  It contains approximately 110 enzymes.

The following information is given:



Whole list navigation

Restriction enzymes

E

F

Notes

Biotechnology
Restriction enzyme cutting sites
Restriction enzymes